The Journal of Atmospheric and Solar-Terrestrial Physics is a monthly peer-reviewed scientific journal covering the atmospheric and solar-terrestrial physics. It was established in 1950 as the Journal of Atmospheric and Terrestrial Physics, obtaining its current name in 1997. It is published by Elsevier and sponsored by the International Union of Radio Science. According to the Journal Citation Reports, the journal has a 2021 impact factor of 2.119. Its founding editor was Edward Victor Appleton, and the current editors are Mark Lester and D. Pancheva.

References

External links 
 

Geophysics journals
Atmospheric sciences journals
Publications established in 1950
Elsevier academic journals
Monthly journals
Space physics journals
English-language journals
Academic journals associated with international learned and professional societies